Some countries' constitutions limit freedom of association by prohibiting paramilitary organizations outside the government constitution. In most cases, there is no definition of paramilitary, and court decisions are responsible for defining that concept.

Angola 
Article 48.4. of Angola constitution prohibits any military, militarized or paramilitary-type associations.

In addition, Article 17.2(e) prohibits the use of military, paramilitary or militarized organizations by political parties.

Brazil 
Article 5.XVII. of Brazil constitution prohibits any paramilitary associations.

In addition, Article 17.§4° prohibits the use of paramilitary organizations by political parties.

Bulgaria 
Article 44.2. of Bulgaria constitution prohibits any organization with paramilitary structures.

Cape Verde 
Article 51.4. of Cape Verde constitution prohibits any paramilitary associations.

In addition, Article 126.1. prohibits the use of paramilitary organizations by political parties.

Comoros 
Article 35 of Comoros constitution prohibits the use of paramilitary organizations by political parties.

Congo 
Article 190 of Congo constitution prohibits any paramilitary groups or private militias under penalty of high treason.

Gabon 
Article 1.22°. of Gabon constitution prohibits private militia or para-military groups.

Guinea-Bissau 
Article 55.3. of Guinea-Bissau constitution prohibits any armed, military, militarized or paramilitary associations.

Iraq 
Article 9.B. of Iraq constitution prohibits the formation of military militias outside the framework of the armed forces.

Kazakhstan 
Article 5.3. of Kazakhstan constitution prohibits any formation of unauthorized paramilitary units.

Kenya 
Article 239.4. of Kenya constitution prohibits any paramilitary associations except authorized by an act of parliament.

In addition, Article 91.2.(c). prohibits the use of paramilitary organizations or militias by political parties.

Mozambique 
Article 52.3. of Mozambique constitution prohibits any armed associations of a military or paramilitary nature.

North Macedonia 
Article 20 of North Macedonia constitution prohibits any military or paramilitary associations which do not belong to the Armed Forces.

Oman 
Article 14 of Oman constitution prohibits any paramilitary formation.

Paraguay 
Article 42 of Paraguay constitution prohibits any paramilitary association.

Philippines 
Article XVIII.Sec 24. of Philippines constitution prohibits private armies and other armed groups not recognized by a duly constituted authority.

Portugal 
Article 46.4. of Portugal constitution prohibits armed associations, military, militarised or paramilitary-type associations.

Romania 
Article 118.4. of Romania constitution prohibits military or paramilitary activities outside the framework of a state authority.

Serbia 
Article 55 of Serbia constitution prohibits any paramilitary association.

South Sudan 
Article 151.3. of South Sudan constitution prohibits any armed or paramilitary force except in accordance with the law.

Spain 
Section 22.5. of Spain constitution prohibits any paramilitary association.

East Timor 
Article 43.3. of East Timor constitution prohibits any armed, military or paramilitary associations.

Ukraine 
Article 37 of Ukraine constitution prohibits political parties and public associations from having paramilitary formations.

Yemen 
Article 36 of Yemen constitution prohibits paramilitary groups.

References

Paramilitary organizations